Orodes III (also spelled Urud III;  Wērōd) was king of the Parthian Empire from 4 to 6. Albeit he was an Arsacid, his lineage is unknown. He was raised to the throne by the nobility two years after the death of the previous co-rulers, Phraates V and Musa. Information regarding the brief reign of Orodes III is lacking. He was killed after a reign of 2 years. He was succeeded by Vonones I.

References

Sources

External links

AD 6 deaths
1st-century Parthian monarchs
Year of birth unknown
Murdered Persian monarchs
1st-century murdered monarchs
1st-century Babylonian kings